Voyeurist is the ninth studio album by American rock band Underoath, released on January 14, 2022 via Fearless Records, after a three-month pushback due to vinyl production delays. It is their first album in four years following Erase Me (2018), marking the longest gap between two studio albums in the band's career without breaking up.

Background 

On July 14, 2021, the band released "Damn Excuses", the lead single from the album. On August 4, 2021, the band released the second single from the album, "Hallelujah".

On September 22, 2021, the band released the third single "Pneumonia" and revealed it was written exactly one year prior to release. The single is the album's seven-minute finale and was partly inspired by the passing of guitarist Tim McTague's father. This was followed by two more singles, "Cycle" featuring Ghostemane, released on October 27, 2021, and "Numb", released on December 8, 2021, the latter described as "a grown-up version of something off their 2004 album They're Only Chasing Safety."

The band described the album as "high-def violence," with a "technologically advanced, but undeniably visceral" sound. Guitarist Tim McTague stated, "I've always wanted to record our own album. I think we just needed to get into a headspace personally that would allow criticism and critique to land in a productive and constructive way. We grew so much in real time and I think the record speaks to that growth and collaboration. I haven't ever felt this attached to a project in my life."

Promotion 

The album was performed live entirely in a livestream concert entitled Voyeurist: Digital Ghost, on December 3, 2021. One attendee would be chosen to receive an Underoath prize pack that includes a vinyl edition of Voyeurist, along with three of their previous albums, They're Only Chasing Safety (2004), Define the Great Line (2006) and Lost in the Sound of Separation (2008) in vinyl as part of the Underoath: Observatory boxset, named after a livestream series of those three albums performed entirely in 2020.

Underoath embarked on a North American tour in support of the album with Spiritbox from February to March. Vocalist Spencer Chamberlain stated about the tour: "There was a time during the pandemic where I didn't know if we’d ever get to tour again. I would sit up at night and try to wrap my brain around a world without live music and I just couldn't ever digest that thought." Every Time I Die was originally to join Underoath and Spiritbox for the Voyeurist tour, but the group split up in January 2022. The group was replaced by Bad Omens and Stray from the Path.

Reception 

Kerrang praised the album, stating that "Voyeurist is arguably the most cohesive and coherent record of Underøath's career to date. It's an album that asks profound questions about the meaning of life and death, about the nature and purpose of existence (and non/un-existence) and about the role that faith and religion play in our lives – all to some of the most punishingly heavy music you’ll hear this year." Wall of Sound gave it a 9/10 rating.

Track listing 

All music written and performed by Underoath, except where noted.

Personnel 
Adapted from Discogs.

Underoath
 Timothy McTague – lead guitar, backing vocals, production, engineering, and bass (according to the liner notes) 
 Christopher Dudley – keyboards, synthesizer, production
 Aaron Gillespie – drums, clean vocals, piano, production
 Spencer Chamberlain – lead vocals, additional guitars, production
 Grant Brandell – bass (did not play on the album according to liner notes)
 James Smith – rhythm guitar

Additional personnel
 Ghostemane – vocals ("Cycle")
 JJ Revell – producer, engineering
 Chad Howat – mixing
 Ted Jensen - mastering

Charts

References

Fearless Records albums
Underoath albums
2022 albums